TCEP (tris(2-carboxyethyl)phosphine) is a reducing agent frequently used in biochemistry and molecular biology applications.  It is often prepared and used as a hydrochloride salt (TCEP-HCl) with a molecular weight of 286.65 gram/mol. It is soluble in water and available as a stabilized solution at neutral pH and immobilized onto an agarose support to facilitate removal of the reducing agent.

Applications
TCEP is often used as a reducing agent to break disulfide bonds within and between proteins as a preparatory step for gel electrophoresis.

Compared to the other two most common agents used for this purpose (dithiothreitol and β-mercaptoethanol), TCEP has the advantages of being odorless, a more powerful reducing agent, an irreversible reducing agent (in the sense that TCEP does not regenerate—the end product of TCEP-mediated disulfide cleavage is in fact two free thiols/cysteines), more hydrophilic, and more resistant to oxidation in air.  It also does not reduce metals used in immobilized metal affinity chromatography.

TCEP is particularly useful when labeling cysteine residues with maleimides. TCEP can keep the cysteines from forming di-sulfide bonds and unlike dithiothreitol and β-mercaptoethanol, it will not react as readily with the maleimide. However, TCEP has been reported to react with maleimide under certain conditions.

TCEP is also used in the tissue homogenization process for RNA isolation.

For Ultraviolet–visible spectroscopy applications, TCEP is useful when it is important to avoid interfering absorbance from 250 to 285 nanometers which can occur with dithiothreitol. Dithiothreitol will slowly over time absorb more and more light in this spectrum as various redox reactions occur.

Reaction

Use in biological research
TCEP is available from various chemical suppliers as the hydrochloride salt. When dissolved in water, TCEP-HCl is acidic. A reported preparation is a 0.5 M TCEP-HCl aqueous stock solution that is pH adjusted to near-neutral pH and stored frozen at -20˚C. TCEP is reportedly less stable in phosphate buffers.

See also
 2-Mercaptoethanol (BME)
 Dithiothreitol (DTT)

References

Carboxylic acids
Tertiary phosphines
Reducing agents